Clarias brachysoma (walking catfish) is a species of fish in the family Clariidae. It is endemic to Sri Lanka. Its natural habitats are rain forest streams and lowland rivers. It is threatened by habitat loss.

It grows to a length of 40 cm. During mating season, spawning occurs in nests among weeds in very shallow water. Then the male guards the nest and young until reaching about 1 cm in length.

References

 Hanssens, M. 2005.  Clarias alluaudi.   2006 IUCN Red List of Threatened Species.   Downloaded on 4 August 2007.
 

Clarias
Taxa named by Albert Günther
Fish described in 1864